Koreatown, Queens, or the Long Island Koreatown, on Long Island in the U.S. state of New York, is one of the largest and fastest-growing ethnic Korean enclaves outside Korea. It includes the north-eastern portion of Queens, a borough of New York City, as well as part of the Gold Coast of Nassau County, outside the New York City limits. Long Island's Koreatown is largely oriented around Northern Boulevard.

Location
The core of this Koreatown originated in the Flushing (플러싱) neighborhood of the New York City borough of Queens (퀸즈). However, this Koreatown has continued to expand rapidly eastward alongside Northern Boulevard through the Queens neighborhoods of Murray Hill, Auburndale, Bayside, Douglaston, Little Neck, and eventually into the Gold Coast of Nassau County (나소 카운티).

History

Development of Flushing's Koreatown
In the 1980s, a continuous stream of Korean immigrants emerged into Flushing, many of whom began as workers in the medical field or Korean international students who had moved to New York City to find or initiate professional or entrepreneurial positions. They established a foothold on Union Street in Flushing between 35th and 41st Avenues, featuring restaurants and karaoke (noraebang) bars, manicure and pedicure salons, grocery markets, education centers and bookstores, banking institutions, offices, consumer electronics vendors, apparel boutiques, and other commercial enterprises, and a Koreatown was conceived in Flushing.

Koreatownscape

Expansion eastward
As the community grew in wealth and population and rose in socioeconomic status, Koreans expanded their presence from Flushing eastward along Northern Boulevard, buying homes in more affluent and less crowded Queens neighborhoods and more recently into adjacent suburban Nassau County, bringing their businesses with them, and thereby expanding the Koreatown itself. This expansion has led to the creation of an American Meokjagolmok, or Korean Restaurant Street, around the Long Island Rail Road station in Murray Hill, Queens, exuding the ambience of Seoul itself. The eastward pressure to expand was also created by the inability to move westward, inhibited by the formidable presence of the enormous Flushing Chinatown centered on Main Street.

Demographics
According to the 2010 United States Census, the Korean population of Queens was 64,107, representing the largest municipality in the United States with a density of at least 500 Korean Americans per square mile; while the Korean population of Nassau County had increased by nearly two-thirds to approximately 14,000 over one decade since the 2000 Census. Along with the two Koreatowns of Bergen County, New Jersey (in Palisades Park and Fort Lee) and the Manhattan Koreatown in New York City, the Long Island Koreatown functions as a satellite node for an overall Korean American population of 218,764 individuals in the New York City Metropolitan Area, the second largest population of ethnic Koreans outside Korea. Korean Air and Asiana Airlines provide non-stop flights from Seoul to JFK Airport in Queens.

Climate
The Long Island Koreatown lies at the northern edge of the humid subtropical climate zone, according to the Köppen climate classification, similar to Seoul, South Korea; Koreatown has a moderately sunny climate, averaging between 2,400 and 2,800 hours of sunshine annually.

Education and public institutions

Koreatown residents can enjoy an urban oasis at Flushing Meadows-Corona Park. Numerous branches of the Queens Library are readily accessible to the Koreatown community, as are branches in Nassau County. The two-county region is served by numerous public, magnet, and private schools, including the highly sought Great Neck School District in Nassau County.

Medical care
Flushing Hospital Medical Center in Queens, North Shore University Hospital in Manhasset, Nassau County, and St. Francis Hospital in Roslyn, also in Nassau County, all serve as medical centers providing the Long Island Koreatown as well as surrounding communities with comprehensive health care services.

Transportation

The intersection of Main Street and Roosevelt Avenue, at the western end of Koreatown, is the third busiest intersection in New York City, behind only Times Square and Herald Square in the borough of Manhattan. Numerous other public bus and rail connections also serve Koreatown at the Main Street/Roosevelt Avenue intersection, including 22 bus lines, and the Port Washington Branch of the Long Island Rail Road. Long Island's Koreatown is also readily accessible by automobile from several major controlled-access highways, including the Grand Central Parkway and the Whitestone Expressway/Van Wyck Expressway.

News organizations
The Korea Times, a news organization based in Seoul, carries a significant presence in the Long Island Koreatown. All of the major New York City daily newspapers are also found ubiquitously in Koreatown, including The New York Times, Newsday, the New York Daily News, and the New York Post.

International media exposure
The Korean Air nut rage incident, which occurred on December 5, 2014, at John F. Kennedy International Airport in Queens, made news headlines around the world, as did the legal case begun in 2015 against Heather Cho, former executive of the chaebol, held in Queens County Court as opposed to the Seoul High Court, per the insistence of flight attendant Kim Do-hee, the plaintiff.

Cuisine
According to The New York Times, a "Kimchi Belt" stretches along Northern Boulevard and the Long Island Rail Road tracks, from Flushing into Nassau County. However, a prominent Korean food chef stated that "Queens is the closest you can come to authentic Korean food." The Long Island Koreatown features numerous restaurants that serve both traditional and/or regional Korean cuisine. As noted above, the development of this Koreatown has led to the creation of an American Meokjagolmok, or Korean Restaurant Street, around the Long Island Rail Road station in Murray Hill, Queens, exuding the ambience of Seoul itself. Korean Chinese cuisine is also available in Koreatown.

Languages
Korean and English are both spoken prevalently in Koreatown. Retail signs employing the Hangul (한글) alphabet are ubiquitous.

Economic and political clout
As Long Island's Korean population has grown, Koreatown has concomitantly gained increasing economic and political clout. Upscale Korean-owned shopping centers continue to open along the Northern Boulevard corridor. In November 2012, Ron Kim was elected as the first Korean American to the New York State Legislature, representing the 40th district.

Social services
A significant array of social services toward assisting recent as well as established Korean immigrants, is readily available in Koreatown.

See also

 Korean Americans in New York City
 Korean diaspora
 Koreatown, Manhattan (맨해튼 코리아타운)
 Koreatown, Palisades Park (팰리세이즈 파크 코리아타운)
 Koreatown, Fort Lee (포트 리 코리아타운)
 Koreatown (코리아타운)
 Chinatown, Flushing (法拉盛華埠)
 Chinatown, Sunset Park (布鲁克林華埠)
 Chinatown, Manhattan (纽约华埠)
 Chinatown, Elmhurst (唐人街, 艾姆赫斯特)

References

Ethnic enclaves in New York (state)
Geography of Nassau County, New York
Korean-American culture in New York (state)
Korean-American culture in New York City
Koreatowns in the United States
Neighborhoods in Queens, New York